Ayopaya Municipality is the first municipal section of the Ayopaya Province in the Cochabamba Department, Bolivia. Its seat is Ayopaya.

See also 
 Ch'illiwani
 Lip'ichi
 Wila Qullu
 Wila Quta

References 

 Instituto Nacional de Estadistica de Bolivia

Municipalities of the Cochabamba Department